The Historic Cody Mural Chapel is a chapel and museum of the Church of Jesus Christ of Latter-day Saints in Cody, Wyoming. The chapel was dedicated in 1949 by Henry D. Moyle and was rededicated in 1972 by Hugh B. Brown.

History 
The idea for the chapel and mural came from Lloyd Taggart and Glenn E. Nielson who were in the local church leadership. Edward Grigware, a local resident, was asked to paint the mural and accepted because he had not painted a religious subject before. Grigware spent a year researching the church before drawing a preliminary sketch. The center opened as an official visitors center in May 1982 with an exhibit explaining how members of the church negotiated water rights with Buffalo Bill.

The Mural 
The mural was painted on the rotunda of the chapel's foyer by Edward T. Grigware and unveiled in 1951. The mural depicts scenes from church history and includes representations of the first eight presidents of the Church of Jesus Christ of Latter-day Saints. As you leave the room a group of faces representing the Mormon pioneers is depicted above the words, "Lest We Forget."

Construction and painting 
The rotunda was constructed by mounting circular boards at  intervals until they reached the center of the ceiling. The top board is suspended to from beams in the roof. The canvas was then hung on the plaster and painted from miniatures. The canvas and paints were imported from outside the United States.

Lithographic reproduction of the mural 
Fred Bond from Los Angeles reproduced the mural for The Cody Mural: A Pictorial History of Mormonism. Several overlapping photos were taken from a platform and turned into negatives.

References 

Latter Day Saint movement in Wyoming
Tourist attractions in Wyoming
Public art in Wyoming